Ved Stranden 12 is a town house located opposite Christiansborg Palace in central Copenhagen, Denmark. The building was listed on the Danish registry of protected buildings and places in 1932. The building is flanked by the Gustmeyer House to the left (No. 14) and the Sundorph to the right (No. 10).

History

18th century

The site was in 1689 part of a larger property, No. 211 in the East Quarter, owned by merchant (urtekræmmer) homas Torsmide's widow. In 1756, it was as No. 248 owned by Christian Frederik Vesterholdt. He was also the owner of Kastrupgård and Kastrup Værk on Amager.

The property was at the time of the 1787 census owned by Dorthe (Dine) Beathe Solle.m widow of the surgeon Johan Christopher Solle. She was operating a barber shop from the premises. She resided there with her four children, five employees and three lodgers.  Another household consisted of the innkeeper Ellef Rejersen, his wife Else Magrethe, their daughter Ane Helene and a maid. 

Dine Beate Solle's son, Johan Christopher Solle, had in 1779 succeeded his father of resident surgeon for Det KongeligeVejsenhus. 

The building was together with most of the other buildings in the area destroyed in the Copenhagen Fire of 1795. The current building was constructed in 1796 for Dine Bente Sonnee.

19th century
The property was at the time of the 1801 census home to a total of 18 people. Solle was still living there with her four children, three employees and two maids. The property was in the new cadastre of 1806 listed as No. 155 and was by then still owned by Dine Bente Solle.

The property was at the time of the 1840 census home to a total of 13 people. Actor at the Royal Danish Theatre Hans Peter Holm (c. 1794 - ) resided with his wife, their three children and a maid on the first floor. Anders Petersen Houlberg	, an innkeeper, resided with a maid on the ground floor. Jens Jensen, a worker, resided with his wife, two children and a maid in the basement.

The property was at the time of the 1845 census home to a total of 9 people. Jacob Christian Blischou Hjorth, a merchant, was residing alone on the second floor. Frederik Bendix Johannes Henriksen, a tobacco-maker, was residing alone on the third floor. The innkeeper Anders Petersen Heulberg	was at the time of the 1850 census residing with a maid on the ground floor.

The property was at the time of the 1850 census home to a total of 13 people. Holm was still living on the first floor with his wife, two children and a maid. Carl Frederik Jensen, a master shoemaker, was now residing in the basement with his wife, niece and an employee. Ove Gotthilf Berger Bloch	, a civil servant working for Kultusministriet, was residing on the second floor.

20th century

Alfred Howitz & Co., a stockbroking firm, was for decades based in the building. The firm was founded on 12 February 1904 by Alfred Howitz. His son by the same name joined the company as a partner in 1948, The company was in 1950 still based in the building.

The building contains a single, 283 square metre apartment. It was put up for sale for DKK 45 mio. in 2016 but later taken off the market.

Architecture
The building consists of three storeys over a high cellar and is four bays wide. The facade is rendered in a pale orange colour with white painted windows and decorative details, A cornice supported by corbels line the top of the building and a second cornice is located between the ground floor and first floor. A central, slightly recessed frieze with three festoons is located between the first and second floor. The green painted entrance door is located in the left-hand side of the building while an inclined hatch farthest to the right affords access to the basement. A two-bay side wing projects from the rear side of the building. The roof is clad with black tiles towards the street and red tiles towards the small courtyard.

References

External links

 Ved Stranden at indenforvoldene.dk

Listed residential buildings in Copenhagen
Houses completed in 1796